A taeniacide is a substance that kills tapeworms.  This makes it a class of antihelminthic agents. 

It gets its name from the genus Taenia.

Examples 
Natural taeniacides include pumpkin seed, cucumber and pomegranate.

Some synthetic taeniacides include diatrizoic acid, praziquantel, bunamidine and niclosamide.

See also 
 Anticestodal agent

References

External links 
 

Anthelmintics